Miss República Dominicana 1990 was held on September 1, 1989. There were 22 candidates, representing provinces and municipalities, who entered. The winner would represent the Dominican Republic at Miss Universe 1990. The first runner up would enter Miss World 1990. The second runner up would enter in Miss International 1990. The rest of finalist entered different pageants.

Results

Contestants

References

External links
search Miss Republica Dominicana 1989

Miss Dominican Republic
1990 beauty pageants
1990 in the Dominican Republic